Gabriel Buscariol Poveda (born 7 July 1998) is a Brazilian footballer who plays as a forward for Bolivian club Bolívar.

Club career
Born in Araçatuba, São Paulo, Poveda was a Guarani youth graduate. After a loan to the under-20 side of Internacional, he made his first team debut for Bugre on 15 June 2018, coming on as a late substitute for Erik in a 0–0 Série B home draw against São Bento.

Poveda scored his first professional goal on 3 November 2018, netting the opener in a 2–0 away win over Coritiba. In January 2019, he moved to Portuguese side Alverca, but returned to his home country shortly after, after being loaned to Athletico Paranaense.

After featuring rarely, Poveda was presented at Juventude on 26 July 2019. He moved to Brasil de Pelotas for the 2020 season, but suffered a serious knee injury in November of that year, being sidelined until the following August.

On 7 January 2022, Poveda joined Sampaio Corrêa, still on loan from Alverca.

Career statistics

Honours
Athletico Paranaense
Campeonato Paranaense: 2019

Sampaio Corrêa
Campeonato Maranhense: 2022

References

External links

1998 births
Living people
People from Araçatuba
Footballers from São Paulo (state)
Brazilian footballers
Association football forwards
Campeonato Brasileiro Série B players
Campeonato Brasileiro Série C players
Campeonato Brasileiro Série D players
Guarani FC players
F.C. Alverca players
Club Athletico Paranaense players
Esporte Clube Juventude players
Grêmio Esportivo Brasil players
Sampaio Corrêa Futebol Clube players
Club Bolívar players
Brazilian expatriate footballers
Brazilian expatriate sportspeople in Portugal
Brazilian expatriate sportspeople in Bolivia
Expatriate footballers in Portugal
Expatriate footballers in Bolivia